Mount Kelly School is a co-educational private day and boarding school in the English public school tradition for pupils from 3 to 18, in Tavistock, Devon.

History 

Mount Kelly was established in June 2014 following the merger of two neighbouring schools, Kelly College and Mount House School.

Kelly College was founded in 1877 after Admiral Benedictus Marwood Kelly left the great part of his real and personal estate to trustees, founding a charity which he directed should be called 'The Kelly College', which should be for the education of the 'sons of Naval officers and other gentlemen'.

Mount House School was founded in 1881 by Miss Parker and Miss Tubbs at Alton House, Tavistock Hill, Plymouth. In 1890 the school moved location to North Hill, Plymouth (now the site of St Matthias church hall), moving in 1900 to larger premises at Mount House, Approach Road, Plymouth (the birthplace of Miss Tubbs).  Plymouth was heavily bombed in World War II and the school relocated to a 50-acre site at Mount Tavy in 1940. Mount House School became co-educational in 1996 with a pre-prep established for 3- to 7-year-olds ten years later.

Co-curricular activities
The school has a Combined Cadet Force, and runs the Duke of Edinburgh Award scheme.

Facilities

In 2016 the school built a 50-metre, 8-lane Olympic Legacy swimming pool, financed in part by Sport England and the National Lottery (United Kingdom).

Inspections
The school is inspected by the Independent Schools Inspectorate.

 Mount Kelly Foundation ISI Integrated Inspection – March 2015.
 Mount Kelly Foundation ISI Regulatory Compliance Report – March 2018.

Notable alumni

Mount Kelly 

 Federico Burdisso, Italian Olympic Swimmer
 Gaurika Singh, Nepalese Olympic Swimmer
 Daniah Hagul, Libyan Olympic Swimmer

Kelly College

Mount House School
 Ed Bye, film and TV producer and director
 Philip de Glanville, former England Rugby captain
 Christopher Hitchens, journalist
 Peter Hitchens, author and writer
 Lord David Owen, former Foreign Secretary and Leader of the SDP
 Lewis Pugh, endurance swimmer and ocean advocate
 David Somerset, chief cashier, Bank of England
 Paul Tyler, Liberal Democrat MP for Bodmin

References

External links
inspection reports

Member schools of the Headmasters' and Headmistresses' Conference
Private schools in Devon
Boarding schools in Devon
Tavistock
Church of England private schools in the Diocese of Exeter
International Baccalaureate schools in England
Educational institutions established in 2014
2014 establishments in England